Nordeus is a Serbian mobile game developer headquartered in New Belgrade. The studio's debut game is Top Eleven Football Manager, a free-to-play social football management simulation game.

In 2013, the game reached the top of the grossing charts in 23 countries on Android and 68 countries on the App Store, according to data from App Annie. It was previously a privately held company with no external funding until it became a subsidiary of Take-Two Interactive in June 2021.

History
Nordeus was founded in March 2010 by former Microsoft employees who were all alumni of the University of Belgrade Faculty of Electrical Engineering. As of 2019, Nordeus had 250 employees. On February 2, 2021, Take-Two Interactive announced that they had acquired Nordeus for $378 million.

Games

Top Eleven - Be a Football Manager

Top Eleven is an online football management simulation game developed and published by Nordeus. Originally launched on Facebook in May 2010, the game was released on mobile platforms in November 2011.

The game lets players build and manage their own football clubs and compete with other players. The game is freemium and generates revenue through in-app purchases.

In March 2013, José Mourinho became the game promoter for Top Eleven, appearing on the official game icon as well as in-game as an advisor for players in tutorial mode.

Thanks to licensing agreements, official kits and emblems from clubs including Liverpool F.C., Real Madrid CF, Arsenal F.C., Juventus F.C. and Borussia Dortmund are available for players to purchase and use for their teams.

Heroic - Magic Duel
In July 2019, Nordeus announced the launch of its new strategy game called Heroic - Magic Duel. Available on iOS and Android, the new game involves PvP lane battles where players must upgrade and master five Heroes each with their own features, abilities, and traits. It remains to be seen whether the new game will gain as much popularity as its predecessor, Top Eleven.

Philanthropy
Nordeus has donated funds to the “Battle for Maternity Wards” campaign initiated by the B92 Fund, helping to fully equip 8 maternity wards in Belgrade, Niš, Vranje, Sombor, Kikinda, Zrenjanin, and Senta.

References

External links

 
 "Bootstrapped and profitable Nordeus taking on EA in the social gaming space" TechCrunch – Startup and Technology News - 16 June 2011
 "Nordeus aiming for the top, relationship with Facebook “very close”" Maya Easty on Exposure - 27 September 2011

Video game companies established in 2010
2021 mergers and acquisitions
Companies based in Belgrade
Serbian companies established in 2010
D.o.o. companies in Serbia
Serbian brands
Take-Two Interactive divisions and subsidiaries
Video game companies of Serbia
Video game development companies
Virtual economies
Mobile game companies